Will Smith is an American actor and producer. His breakthrough came when he played a fictionalised version of himself in the 1990s television sitcom The Fresh Prince of Bel-Air. The role brought him international recognition and two Golden Globe Award nominations for Best Actor – Television Series Musical or Comedy. He also served as an executive producer on 24 episodes of the series. Two years later, Smith made his film debut in the drama Where the Day Takes You, where he appeared as a disabled homeless man. In 1995, he starred as a police officer with Martin Lawrence in Michael Bay's Bad Boys. The following year, Smith appeared as a Marine Corps pilot with Jeff Goldblum in Roland Emmerich's science fiction film Independence Day. The film grossed over $817 million at the worldwide box office and was the highest grossing of 1996. In 1997, he starred as Agent J in the science fiction film Men in Black, a role he reprised in its sequels Men in Black II (2002) and Men in Black 3 (2012).

Smith portrayed heavyweight boxer Muhammad Ali in the 2001 biopic Ali. For his performance he was nominated for the Academy Award for Best Actor and the Golden Globe Award for Best Actor – Motion Picture Drama. In 2004, he appeared in the animated film Shark Tale, and science fiction film I, Robot. The following year he starred as a professional dating consultant in the romantic comedy Hitch. Smith's portrayal of entrepreneur and salesman Chris Gardner in the biopic The Pursuit of Happyness (2006) received Academy Award and Golden Globe Award nominations for Best Actor. In 2008, he played a vigilante superhero in Hancock. While the film received mixed to negative reviews, it became his eighth consecutive to gross over $100 million at the North American box office and grossed a worldwide total of over $624 million. In 2015, Smith portrayed Nigerian-American physician Bennet Omalu in the biopic Concussion for which he garnered a nomination for a Golden Globe Award. The following year, he appeared in the action film Suicide Squad, which grossed over $745 million at the worldwide box office. In 2019, Smith starred as the Genie in the live-action adaptation of the 1992 animation film of the same name, Aladdin. The film is his highest grossing, with a worldwide box office total of over $1 billion. In 2022, Smith won the Academy Award for Best Actor for his performance as tennis coach Richard Williams in King Richard.

Film

Television

See also 
 List of awards and nominations received by Will Smith

Notes

References

External links 
 

Filmography
Male actor filmographies
American filmographies